Autosticha leucoptera is a moth in the family Autostichidae. It was described by John Frederick Gates Clarke in 1986. It is found on the Marquesas Archipelago in French Polynesia.

References

Moths described in 1986
Autosticha
Moths of Oceania